The Nokia 5630 XpressMusic is a multimedia and music-dedicated smartphone announced in March and released in May 2009, running Symbian v9.3.

References

External links
 Official Nokia Europe page
 Nokia Forum page with full specifications

5630
Symbian devices